Compagno is a surname. Notable people with the surname include:

Andrea Compagno (born 1996), Italian footballer
Emily Compagno (born 1979), American attorney and television host
Leonard Compagno, American ichthyologist
Scipione Compagno ( 1624–after 1680), Italian painter
Tony Compagno (1921–1971), American football player

See also 

 Daihatsu Compagno